Einion, the Welsh form of the Latin Ennianus, is a male Welsh given name and may refer to:

Einion Offeiriad ("Einion the Priest") (died 1356), Welsh poet and grammarian
Einion ap Gwalchmai (1202–1223), Welsh court poet
Einion ap Gwgon, Welsh court poet
Einion ap Gollwyn, (possibly legendary) Welsh prince of the eleventh century
Einion Wan, Welsh court poet
Saint Einion Frenin, a son of Owain Ddantgwyn who reigned as a local king in Gwynedd
Einion Yrth ap Cunedda (reigned from the 470s), king of Gwynedd

See also
Cefn Einion, small dispersed village in South Shropshire, England
 Anian (disambiguation)
 Anianus (disambiguation)
 Eifion (disambiguation)

References